Joseph Maximilian Fridolin Ritter von Maillinger (4 October 1820 – 6 October 1901) was a Bavarian General der Infanterie and War Minister under Ludwig II of Bavaria.

Biography 
Von Maillinger was born in Passau. After passing his company officer career, at last in the Generalquartiermeister staff in Munich, he was transferred to the General Command in Munich as major of the general staff. The first time, he served for the war ministry, he was ordered by Von Lüder. In 1863 he became head of department at the war ministry. Also he was adjutant of Eduard von Lutz, as well as representative of him at the Landtag. In 1865 he was advanced to Oberstleutnant, in 1866 he Oberst. Thenceforward he was commander of the 7th Royal Bavarian Infantry Regiment and deputy of Von Lutz. In 1869 he became major general and commander of the 8th Royal Bavarian Infantry Brigade. One year after that, he was advanced to lieutenant general, and led the 2nd Royal Bavarian Division during the campaigns of the Franco-Prussian War, which stood in France as part of the Bavarian occupation army until 1873. After he returned to Bavaria, he became commander of the II Royal Bavarian Corps. During the period, when he served as war minister, he was advandced to General der Infanterie in 1877 and got the main ownership of the 9th Royal Bavarian Infantry Regiment "Wrede" The psychiatrist and neurologist Prof. Dr. Dr. Dres. h.c. Heinz Häfner says, Maillinger's withdrawal from his ministry post was caused by Ludwig II's reputed sexual abuse of young cavalrists (chevau-légers). Ritter von Maillinger became a member of the Reichsrat in 1888. He died in Bad Aibling.<ref
name="HdBG">Maillinger, Josef Maximilian Fridolin Ritter von, House of the Bavarian history (HdBG).</ref> The Maillingerstraße in Munich is named in honor of him.

Awards 
He received the following honours:
 :
 Knight of St. Hubert
 Knight of the Military Order of Max Joseph, 1870
 Knight of Merit of the Bavarian Crown
 Knight of the Merit Order of St. Michael, 1st Class
 Commander of the Military Merit Order
 : Knight of the Iron Crown, 3rd Class
  Kingdom of Prussia:
 Grand Cross of the Red Eagle
 Pour le Mérite (military), 19 January 1873
 Iron Cross, 1st Class
 : Grand Cross of the Albert Order

References and notes

External links 
 Maillinger, Joseph Maximilian Fridolin, Ritter von, Meyers Konversations-Lexikon

1820 births
1901 deaths
People from Passau
Bavarian Ministers of War
Bavarian generals
People from the Kingdom of Bavaria
Members of the Bavarian Reichsrat
Knights of the Military Order of Max Joseph
Recipients of the Military Merit Order (Bavaria)
Recipients of the Pour le Mérite (military class)
Recipients of the Iron Cross, 1st class